European Universities Taekwondo Championships were the first organised in 2009 and are organised every two years.

The European Universities Taekwondo Championships are coordinated by the European University Sports Association along with the 18 other sports on the program of the European universities championships.

Summary

See also
European Taekwondo Championships
European Taekwondo Championships Olympic Weight Categories
European Juniors Taekwondo Championships

External links

References

taekwondo
Taekwondo competitions
Recurring sporting events established in 2009
2009 establishments in Europe